FBISD may refer to:

The Fort Bend Independent School District, in Fort Bend County, Texas
The Flour Bluff Independent School District, in Corpus Christi, Texas